The Bronx is the third studio album by punk rock band The Bronx. It was released on November 11, 2008.

Track listing

References 

2008 albums
The Bronx (band) albums